An empire is a group of states or peoples under centralized rule.

Empire may also refer to:

Buildings
 Empire (skyscraper), formerly the Imperia Tower, a complex in Moscow, Russia
 Empire, Colombo, a residential complex in Sri Lanka
 Empire State Building, a skyscraper in New York City

Places in the United States 
 Empire, Alabama, an unincorporated community in Walker County, Alabama
 Empire, Arkansas
 Empire, California, in Stanislaus County
 Empire, Colorado
 Empire, Georgia
 Empire, Kentucky
 Empire, Louisiana
 Empire, Michigan
 Empire, Missouri
 Empire, Nevada
 Empire, Ormsby County, Nevada
 Empire, Ohio
 Empire, Oregon
 Empire, Wisconsin
 Empire, Wyoming

Arts, entertainment, and media

Comics and graphic novels
 Empire (comics), a 2000 DC Comics miniseries
 Empire (graphic novel), by Samuel R. Delany and Howard Chaykin
 Empyre, a 2020 Marvel Comics miniseries

Films
 Empire (1965 film), by Andy Warhol
 Empire (1986 film), by Alexander Sokurov
 Empire (2002 film), starring John Leguizamo
 The Empire Strikes Back, a 1980 film referred to as "Empire" by the Star Wars community

Gaming

Computer and video games
 Empire (1972 video game), a 1972 4X wargame
 Empire (1977 video game), a 1977–2004 series of turn-based strategy games invented by Walter Bright
 Empire: Wargame of the Century, video game developed by Walter Bright and published by Interstel Corporation in 1987
 Empire (PLATO), a 1973 space battle game for the PLATO system
 Empire, a 1980s strategy game for the BBC Micro
 Empire, or Empire: Alpha Complex, the working titles for the Xbox Live Arcade game Shadow Complex
 Empire!, a 1986 space trading and combat video game
 Empire: Total War, a 2009 strategy computer game
 Empires: Dawn of the Modern World, a 2003 computer game in the Empire Earth series
 The Empire, a video game trilogy (I: World Builders, II: Interstellar Sharks, III: Armageddon), developed by David Mullich

Other games 
 Empire LRP, a large UK fest game run by Profound Decisions
 The Empire (Warhammer)

Literature
 Empire (Card novel), 2006 novel by Orson Scott Card
 Empire (Hardt and Negri book), a 2000 book about imperialism by Michael Hardt and Antonio Negri
 Empire (H. Beam Piper book), 1981 short story collection by H. Beam Piper
 Empire (Saylor novel), by Steven Saylor
 Empire (Vidal novel), a 1987 Narratives of Empire novel by Gore Vidal
 Empire (graphic novel), a 1978 graphic novel by Samuel R. Delany
 Empire, a The Legend of Sigmar book by Graham McNeill
 Empire, a Galaxy Science Fiction Novel by Clifford D. Simak
 Empire: How Britain Made the Modern World, a book by Niall Ferguson
 Empire: What Ruling the World Did to the British, a book by Jeremy Paxman
 Empire Trilogy, a fantasy series by Raymond E. Feist and Janny Wurts
 Galactic Empire series, a sci-fi series by Isaac Asimov
 The Empire (play), by DC Moore

Music

Groups 
 Empire (band), a British-German metal band
 Empire (English band)
 Empire (Japanese group), a Japanese idol group
 Empire! Empire! (I Was a Lonely Estate), an emo group
 Empires (band), an American rock group

Albums 
 Empire (Circle album), 2004, or the title song
 Empire (Scott Colley album), 2010
 Empire (Frankie DeCarlos album), 2011
 Empire (EP), by The Word Alive, 2009
 Empire (Kasabian album), 2006
 Empire (Madball album), 2010, or the title song
 Empire (Derek Minor album), 2015 album by American artist Derek Minor
 Empire (Queensrÿche album), 1990
 Empire (Super8 & Tab album), 2010
 Empire, from the Hood to Hollywood, 2015 album by American rapper Master P
 Empires (Animosity album), 2005, or the title song
 Empires (Hillsong United album), 2015, or the title song
 Empires (Jimi Jamison album), 1999
 Empires (VNV Nation album), 1999
 The Empire (album), by Vader, 2016

Songs 
 "Empire" (Kasabian song), 2006
 "Empire" (Queensrÿche song), 1990
 "Empire" (Shakira song), 2014
 "Empire", a song by Asking Alexandria on the album Asking Alexandria
 "Empire", a song by August Burns Red on the album Leveler
 "Empire", a song by Bomb the Bass
 "Empire", a song by Boysetsfire on the album The Misery Index: Notes from the Plague Years
 "Empire (Let Them Sing)", a song by Bring Me the Horizon on the album Sempiternal
 "Empire", a song by David Byrne on the album Grown Backwards
 "Empire", a song by Chimaira on the album Resurrection
 "Empire", a song by Fear Factory on the album Transgression
 "Empire", a song by Ella Henderson on the album Chapter One
 "Empire", a song by Hybrid on the album Disappear Here
 "Empire", a song by In Strict Confidence on the album Face the Fear
 "Empire", a song by Mac on the album Shell Shocked
 "Empire", a song by Machinae Supremacy on the album Redeemer
 "Empire", a song by Of Monsters and Men on the album Beneath the Skin
 "Empire", a song by Pete Philly and Perquisite on the album Mystery Repeats
 "Empire", a song by Superheist on the album Identical Remote Controlled Reactions
 "Empire", a song by The Black Angels on the album Passover
 "Empire", a song by Trampled by Turtles on the album Duluth
 "Empire", a song by Dar Williams on the album My Better Self
 "Empires", a song by 10 Years on the album The Autumn Effect
 "Empires", a song by Chicane on the album Easy to Assemble
 "Empires", a song by Snog
 "Empires (Bring Me Men)", a 2002 song by Lamya on the album Learning from Falling
 "Empires" (Alicja Szemplińska song), the Polish entry for the Eurovision Song Contest 2020

Periodicals 
 Empire (film magazine), a British film magazine
 Empire (newspaper), an Australian newspaper
 Empire News, an 1884–1960 British newspaper

Television
 Empire (1962 TV series), a Western series
 Empire (1984 TV series), a sitcom
 Empire (2005 TV series), a historical drama series
 Empire (2006 TV series), a current-events series
 Empire (2012 TV series), a documentary series
 Empire (2015 TV series), a music industry drama series
 "Empire" (Law & Order), a 1999 episode of the police/legal drama series
 The Empire (Indian TV series), a 2021 historical drama centered on the Mughal Empire
 The Empire (South Korean TV series), a 2022 drama series

Other uses in arts, entertainment, and media
 Empire (show), a contemporary circus show that debuted in New York City
 Galactic Empire (Star Wars), a fictional autocracy in the Star Wars franchise

Brands and enterprises

Airlines
 Empire Airlines (1976–1985), a defunct American airline
 Empire Airlines, an American airline
 Empires Airlines, an American airline that operated in the 1940s

Motor vehicles
 Empire (1901 automobile), an American automobile manufactured 1901–1902
 Empire (1910 automobile), an American automobile manufactured 1910–1919
 Dial EV Empire, a Chinese automobile

Other brands and enterprises
 Empire Company, a Canadian holding company
 Empire Theatres, the second-largest movie theatre chain in Canada and a subsidiary of the above company
 Empire Distribution, an American distribution company and record label
 Empire Interactive, a video game publisher
 Empire Records (disambiguation), any of several record labels
 Empire Theatre (41st Street), a Broadway theatre that was prominent in the first half of the twentieth century
 Empire Today, an American home furnishing company
 Moss Empires music hall theatres, and now cinemas as well, originally including:
 O2 Shepherd's Bush Empire
 Empire Cinemas, a British cinema chain, or any of its theatres
 Empire, Leicester Square, a central London cinema owned by Empire Cinemas

 Hackney Empire, London
 Liverpool Empire Theatre, Liverpool, England

Plants and animals 
 Empire (apple), a cultivar of apple
 Empire (biology), a taxonomic rank of organisms

Transportation
 Empire ships, ships prefixed Empire - many ships operated by the British Government
 Short Empire, a pre-WWII flying boat

Sports
 Atlanta Empire, an American women's gridiron football team
 Empire Cricket Club, Barbados
 Empire Games, a sporting festival now known as the Commonwealth Games
 The Empire (professional wrestling), a professional wrestling stable, formed in 2020 in New Japan Pro-Wrestling (NJPW)

Other uses
 Empire (program), a computer software for molecular orbital calculations
 Empire High School, Tucson, Arizona
 Empire silhouette, a style of women's fashion
 Empire style, a design movement
 Project EMPIRE, a design-study for a human mission to Mars

See also
 Emperor (disambiguation)
 Empire City (disambiguation)
 Empire series (disambiguation)
 Empire State (disambiguation)
 Empire Township (disambiguation)
 Inland Empire (disambiguation)
 Imperium (disambiguation)
 New Empire (disambiguation)